is a Japanese manga series written and illustrated by Nobuhiro Watsuki. His wife, Kaworu Kurosaki, is credited as a story consultant. It is a direct sequel to Rurouni Kenshin and follows Himura Kenshin and his friends in 1883 Japan as they traverse Hokkaido in search of his father-in-law.

It has been serialized monthly in Jump Square since September 4, 2017, with the chapters collected into eight tankōbon volumes by its publisher Shueisha, as of January 2023. North American publisher Viz Media released the series digitally in Weekly Shonen Jump simultaneously as it ran in Japan until November 2017.

Plot
In 1883, Himura Kenshin, having married Kamiya Kaoru, became a father to Himura Kenji and, with his body deteriorating, still fights for those in need. Former criminals Inoue Aran and Hasegawa Ashitaro, the latter a former member of Shishio Makoto's faction, have become live-in students at the Kamiya Dojo in Tokyo. Kubota Asahi, a member of the Yaminobu, also starts living at the dojo. The Yaminobu accidentally left behind a recent photograph taken in Hokkaido of Kaoru's father, Kamiya Koshijirō, who was thought to have died in the Seinan War. After reacquiring his sakabatō or reversed-edge sword from Myōjin Yahiko, Kenshin, his family, and the new residents of Kamiya Dojo head to Hokkaido to find Koshijirō.

There they reunite with Sagara Sanosuke and team up with Saitō Hajime when they get involved in stopping the mysterious group named Kenkaku Heiki, who create havoc throughout Japan in order to gain battle experience to protect the country from foreign threats. Saitō recruits his former comrade Nagakura Shinpachi and former Juppongatana members Seta Sōjirō, Yūkyūzan Anji, Sawagejō Chō, Honjō Kamatari and Kariwa Henya to aid them.

Characters

The former legendary assassin known as Hitokiri Battōsai, Kenshin now lives a peaceful life with his family. His body is deteriorating due to the continuous usage of the Hiten Mitsurugi style of swordsmanship. After being given back his sakabatō from Myōjin Yahiko, Kenshin continues to protect the weak for as long as his body will hold up.

An orphaned 16-year-old boy just released from prison. Born in Niigata Prefecture, he survived by stealing crops and foraging the mountains. Although claiming to have served five years in a Tokyo prison for dine and dash, it is suspected to have been for being a gofer member of Shishio Makoto's faction, which planned to take over Japan before disbanding when their leader died five years ago. He possesses Shishio's sword, Mugenjin, but due to his propensity for entering uncontrolled fits of rage, Kenshin asks him not to draw it.

A 16-year-old boy who grew up in the Westernized portion of Japan. He was jailed in Tokyo for three months for attempting to be a stowaway on a ship to the Americas. He is revealed to be half-Japanese with blond hair and suspected to be the son of a prostitute to foreigners.

A war orphan raised by the Yaminobu but claims to be a pacifist. Following their failure to kill Kenshin during the Bakumatsu, the Yaminobu lost status and were reduced to working as mercenaries for hire. Kubota was hired to Shishio's faction and later trailed Ashitaro to retrieve Shishio's sword.

A mysterious group who claim to have been initially formed by ancestors in the Kamakura period who stopped the Mongol invasions of Japan. Having stayed hidden for over 500 years, they take over Mount Hakodate and launch other attacks in Japan in order to gain battle experience to fend off future foreign invasions.

Production
In the final tankōbon volume of the original Rurouni Kenshin, published in November 1999, Nobuhiro Watsuki said that he had ideas for a "Hokkaido episode, a sequel" but wanted to start a new manga and so ended the series. In September 2012, Watsuki revealed that he considered drawing the Hokkaido arc before creating Rurouni Kenshin: Restoration. But with the theme of the series concluded in the final arc of the original and unable to come up with a new one, he said that there was "just no way" he could write it. In July 2013, following the positive reception of the live-action film and the conclusion of Restoration, Watsuki said although Rurouni Kenshin concluded once over ten years ago, "there are many requests for its continuation both from the creator and fans. Then why not continue expanding its world for a little while longer? That's how I feel at the moment." Although he said he had not yet decided if he would write it as a manga again. The fact that the original manga ended with Kenshin as a family man bothered Watsuki as he was not sure if Kenshin should fight again now that he happily married. Watsuki's wife Kaworu Kurosaki found such ending boring but still decided to help him with the new manga when it came to research. 

Due to the dark nature of Kenshin's life, Watsuki ended the manga in the Jinchu arc afraid that if he continued writing, the series would not fit the shonen manga demography. When watching the live-action films, Watsuki decided to make a reboot of the series, Restoration, but still had no plans for Hokkaido. Upon watching the Rurouni Kenshin musical, Watsuki was convinced to write Hokkaido as soon as he finished writing the his recent work Embalming. In order to keep the cheerful feeling of the original series, Watsuki wrote the new characters who are nicely treated by Kenshin and Kaoru. Upon helping the staff from the live-action films, The Final and The Beginning, Watsuki came up with new ideas to give Kenshin's story a happy ending despite his hitokiri actions. Watsuki believes that Takeru Satoh's portrayal of the main character stands out as stronger than the manga one, most notably in The Final. He felt that Kenshin was a "King Type" character similar to Monkey D. Luffy from Eiichiro Oda's One Piece as a result of how heroic they are. Watsuki also reflected on Kenshin's pacifism which became a common trend in other heroes in Weekly Shonen Jump protagonists like Luffy and Naruto Uzumaki who fight but are against the idea of killing their enemies while in the case of Dragon Ball dead characters are often revived. He believes newer series like Attack on Titan, Demon Slayer: Kimetsu no Yaiba and Jujutsu Kaisen explored more the concept of death. Nevertheless, the Kenshin Watsuki was still written for the Hokkaido Arc with the idea of sparing his enemies. 

On November 4, 2016, Watsuki began a two chapter spinoff titled  in the December 2016 issue of the monthly Jump Square. The two chapters were inspired by buddy films with Watsuki remembering the ideal designs needed for the protagonists to be likable citing Ushio and Tora as an example. The first chapter had little hints about Ashitaro being related to Rurouni Kenshin with the second one expanding it more. Since the young character Myojin Yahiko already matured in the original Rurouni Kenshin, Watsuki created Ashitaro in order to have him act more like him during early years. The second chapter, published on December 2, 2016, revealed that the story is actually a prologue to a new arc of Rurouni Kenshin scheduled to begin in spring 2017. Delayed until summer, Rurouni Kenshin: The Hokkaido Arc began publication on September 4, 2017, in the October 2017 issue of Jump Square. In order to promote the series, multiple posters of Kenshin were on display in Shinjuku Station.

On November 21, 2017, Watsuki was charged with possession of child pornography. That same day, Shueisha suspended publication of new chapters of The Hokkaido Arc beginning with the January 2018 issue, which was released on December 4, 2017. The manga resumed serialization in the July 2018 issue, released on June 4, 2018. The series began a two month hiatus with the July 2021 issue that went on sale in June, and returned in August with the September 2021 issue.

Publication
The two-parts of Rurouni Kenshin Side Story: The Ex-Con Ashitaro were published on November 4 and December 2, 2016 in Shueisha's Jump Square. Rurouni Kenshin: The Hokkaido Arc began monthly publication in the same magazine on September 4, 2017. Shueisha has collected the chapters into individual tankōbon volumes. The first volume was released on September 4, 2018. As of January 4, 2023, eight volumes have been released.

Viz Media released an English translation of The Ex-Con Ashitaro in their digital Weekly Shonen Jump magazine. The first part was included in the December 19, 2016 bonus issue and the second in the January 2, 2017 bonus issue. On September 4, 2017, they began simultaneously publishing The Hokkaido Arc in the magazine as it ran in Japan. Following Watsuki's being charged, Viz did not continue English publication when the series resumed in Japan, making the November 6, 2017 issue its last.

Volume list

Chapters not yet in tankōbon format
These chapters have yet to be published in a tankōbon volume. They were serialized in issues of Jump Square.

Reception
In July 2019, Jump Square announced that Rurouni Kenshin: The Hokkaido Arc had 1.2 million copies in print. The first volume debuted at number four on Oricon's list of the best-selling manga with 172,160 copies sold. By its sixth week, it had sold 322,520 copies. The second volume debuted at number three with 201,590 copies sold, while volume three debuted at number three, selling 111,231 copies. Volumes three and four's initial printings of 350,000 copies were some of the highest first printings that Shueisha made for manga between 2019–2020 and 2020–2021 respectively. Natalie reported that volume four was the fifth best-selling manga at Tsutaya stores during its first week of release. Volume five debuted on the Oricon chart at number six with 108,859 copies sold, while volume six topped the chart in its first week with 75,731 copies sold. Volume seven sold 117,720 copies its first week, but peaked at third place on the Oricon chart. Volume eight debuted in second place with 95,594 copies sold.

Based on the first volume only, the January 2019 issue of Da Vinci magazine included Rurouni Kenshin: The Hokkaido Arc at number 21 on its annual "Book of the Year" list for 2018. The list was voted on by 4,275 book reviewers, writers, and bookstore employees.

Notes

References

External links
Official page at Jump Square 

2016 comics endings
Adventure anime and manga
Anime and manga set in Hokkaido
Fiction set in 1883
Historical anime and manga
Martial arts anime and manga
Rurouni Kenshin
Samurai in anime and manga
Sequel comics
Shueisha manga
Shōnen manga
Viz Media manga